Herisau railway station is a railway station in Herisau, in the Swiss canton of Appenzell Ausserrhoden. It is an intermediate station on the  Bodensee–Toggenburg line of Südostbahn and the  Gossau–Wasserauen line of Appenzell Railways. Both companies have separate tracks and facilities, separated by Bahnhofplatz.

Layout 
Herisau serves both the east–west  Bodensee–Toggenburg line of Südostbahn (SOB) and the north–south  Gossau–Wasserauen line of Appenzell Railways (AB). SOB has two platforms serving three tracks ( 1–3) on the north side of Bahnhofplatz. AB is similarly situated, with two platforms serving tracks 11–13 south of Bahnhofplatz.

A major project is underway to improve access to the station and redevelop parts of the site. This project will shift the Appenzell Railways tracks and platforms a short distance to the south, permitting the construction of a new bus loading area off Bahnhofplatz. Besides affording greater capacity, this loading area will be handicap-accessible. Traffic congestion will be further reduced by the construction of a roundabout at the intersection of Bahnhofplatz and Bahnhofstrasse, just west of the station. Construction work began in January 2021; it is estimated that the entire project will be complete by 2028.

Services 
 the following services stop at Herisau:

  Voralpen-Express: hourly service over the Bodensee–Toggenburg line between Lucerne and St. Gallen.
 : hourly service over the Bodensee–Toggenburg line to Konstanz.
 St. Gallen S-Bahn:
 : hourly service over the Bodensee–Toggenburg line between Nesslau-Neu St. Johann and Altstätten SG.
 : hourly service over the Bodensee–Toggenburg line via Sargans (circular operation).
 : half-hourly service over the Gossau–Wasserauen line between Gossau SG and Wasserauen.
 : hourly service over the Bodensee–Toggenburg line to St. Gallen.

Notes

References

External links 
 
 

Railway stations in the canton of Appenzell Ausserrhoden
Südostbahn stations
Herisau
Appenzell Railways stations
Railway stations in Switzerland opened in 1910